The King's Indian Attack (or KIA), also known as the Barcza System (after Gedeon Barcza) is a chess opening  for White, characterized by several moves. The center pawns are developed to e4 and d3, the knights are developed to d2 and f3, the king's bishop fianchettoes at g2 following the g-pawn's movement to g3, and White castles kingside.  The resulting arrangement has multiple positional themes: the pawn at d3 and the knight at d2 both defend the pawn at e4, the knight at f3 attacks the center, the fianchettoed bishop may influence the center following subsequent moves, and castling removes the king to safety while bringing a rook into the game.

Unlike other chess openings, The King's Indian Attack is not a specific sequence of moves, but rather a system for White where the moves may be permuted at the player's discretion, in response to the moves of the black pieces.  When a game opens with most or all of the above moves, to the exclusion of moves which typify other openings, the game may be described as a King's Indian Attack.

Characteristics
The KIA is a mirror image of the setup adopted by Black in the King's Indian Defence. But, because of White's extra tempo, the nature of the subsequent play is often different from that of a typical King's Indian Defence.

By its nature, the KIA is a closed, strategic opening that presents its practitioner with common themes and tactics and a comfortable middlegame against various defences. White's most common plan involves a central pawn push, e4–e5, leading to a central bind, and concrete attacking chances on a kingside-castled black king.  Black's resources—more  space for example—are not to be underestimated.  In fact, this asymmetry often leads to violent middlegames and neatly constructed mating nets involving sacrifices.

Use
The KIA is often used against the semi-open defences where Black responds asymmetrically to e4, such as in the French Defence, Sicilian Defence, or Caro–Kann Defence.  Yet it can also be played against Black's more common  defenses, usually through a move order that begins with 1.Nf3 and a later fianchetto of the white-square bishop.  For this reason, transpositions to the Réti Opening, Catalan Opening, English opening or even the Nimzo-Larsen Attack (after b3 and Bb2) are not uncommon.

The KIA is considered a solid opening choice for White, although less ambitious than many more popular openings.  Though rarely used at the highest levels except to avoid some pet lines, it is extremely popular at the club level because it is easier to learn than other openings that require memorising specific move orders to avoid bad positions.

Barcza System

King's Indian Attack (A07) is 1.Nf3 d5 2.g3 (see diagram). Common Black responses are 2...Nf6, 2...c6, 2...Bg4, 2...c5, and 2...g6. Then White can play 3.Bg2.

King's Indian Attack (A08) is 1.Nf3 d5 2.g3 c5 3.Bg2.

1.Nf3 d5 2.g3 Bg4 3.Bg2 Nd7 is the Keres Variation.

Transposition from other lines
1.Nf3 Nf6 2.g3 d5
1.Nf3 c5 2.g3 d5

Transposition to other lines
1.Nf3 d5 2.g3 Nf6 3.d4 (D02)

Famous games
The following games are perhaps the most famous examples of the King's Indian Attack.
 One of the earliest examples: Bonnerjee Mohishunder–John Cochrane, Calcutta, India, 1850 1.Nf3 b6 2.g3 Bb7 3.Bg2 g6 4.O-O Bg7 5.d3 e6 6.e4 Ne7 7.c3 O-O 8.b3 f5 9.exf5 Nxf5 10.d4 a5 11.a4 Ra7 12.Ra2 d6 13.Re1 Qf6 14.Nbd2 Bxf3 15.Nxf3 c5 16.Ng5 cxd4 17.Nxe6 Re8 18.Bd5 Kh8 19.Bg5 Qf7 20.Nxg7 Rxe1+ 21.Qxe1 Qxd5 22.Nxf5 Qxf5 23.Qe8+ Kg7 24.Qxb8 Rf7 25.Qxd6 Qb1+ 26.Kg2 Qxa2 27.Qxd4+ Kg8 28.Bh6 Re7 29.Qd5+ 1-0
 Fischer–Myagmarsuren, Sousse Interzonal 1967 1.e4 e6 2.d3 d5 3.Nd2 Nf6 4.g3 c5 5.Bg2 Nc6 6.Ngf3 Be7 7.0-0 0-0 8.e5 Nd7 9.Re1 b5 10.Nf1 b4 11.h4 a5 12.Bf4 a4 13.a3 bxa3 14.bxa3 Na5 15.Ne3 Ba6 16.Bh3 d4 17.Nf1 Nb6 18.Ng5 Nd5 19.Bd2 Bxg5 20.Bxg5 Qd7 21.Qh5 Rfc8 22.Nd2 Nc3 23.Bf6 Qe8 24.Ne4 g6 25.Qg5 Nxe4 26.Rxe4 c4 27.h5 cxd3 28.Rh4 Ra7 29.Bg2 dxc2 30.Qh6 Qf8 31.Qxh7+ 1–0 
 Réti–Rubinstein, Karlsbad 1923 1.Nf3 d5 2.g3 Nf6 3.Bg2 g6 4.c4 d4 5.d3 Bg7 6.b4 0-0 7.Nbd2 c5 8.Nb3 cxb4 9.Bb2 Nc6 10.Nbxd4 Nxd4 11.Bxd4 b6 12.a3 Bb7 13.Bb2 bxa3 14.Rxa3 Qc7 15.Qa1 Ne8 16.Bxg7 Nxg7 17.0-0 Ne6 18.Rb1 Bc6 19.d4 Be4 20.Rd1 a5 21.d5 Nc5 22.Nd4 Bxg2 23.Kxg2 Rfd8 24.Nc6 Rd6 25.Re3 Re8 26.Qe5 f6 27.Qb2 e5 28.Qb5 Kf7 29.Rb1 Nd7 30.f3 Rc8 31.Rd3 e4 32.fxe4 Ne5 33.Qxb6 Nxc6 34.c5 Rd7 35.dxc6 Rxd3 36.Qxc7+ Rxc7 37.exd3 Rxc6 38.Rb7+ Ke8 39.d4 Ra6 40.Rb6 Ra8 41.Rxf6 a4 42.Rf2 a3 43.Ra2 Kd7 44.d5 g5 45.Kf3 Ra4 46.Ke3 h5 47.h4 gxh4 48.gxh4 Ke7 49.Kf4 Kd7 50.Kf5 1–0
 Another example is Garry Kasparov–Deep Blue, 1997 rematch, game 1.
 Still another example is Fischer-Sherwin, East Orange, New Jersey Open, 1957 1.e4 c5 2.Nf3 e6 3.d3 Nc6 4.g3 Nf6 5.Bg2 Be7 6.0-0 0-0 7.Nbd2 Rb8 8.Re1 d6 9.c3 b6 10.d4 Qc7 11.e5 Nd5 12.exd6 Bxd6 13.Ne4 c4 14.Nxd6 Qxd6 15.Ng5 Nce7 16.Qc2 Ng6 17.h4 Nf6 18.Nxh7 Nxh7 19.h5 Nh4 20.Bf4 Qd8 21.gxh4 Rb7 22.h6 Qxh4 23.hxg7 Kxg7 24.Re4 Qh5 25.Re3 f5 26.Rh3 Qe8 27.Be5+ Nf6 28.Qd2 Kf7 29.Qg5 Qe7 30.Bxf6 Qxf6 31.Rh7+ Ke8 32.Qxf6 Rxh7 33.Bc6+ 1–0

References

Bibliography
 Dunnington, Angus (1998): The Ultimate King's Indian Attack, London: B.T.Batsford Ltd, 
 Eggers, Heiko (2008): Theorie der Eröffnung - Königsindischer Angriff - Das Spielsystem mit dem Aufbau Sf3/g3/Lg2/0-0/d3/Sbd2/, Norderstedt: Books on Demand, 
 Emms, John (2005): starting out:  king's Indian attack, London: Everyman Chess, 
 Smith, Ken and Hall, John (1988): King's Indian Attack – A Complete Opening System also a Weapon to be used against ..., Dallas Texas: Chess Digest,

Further reading
 Hall, John (1972): A Complete Opening System for White: King's Indian Attack, Dallas: Chess Digest Magazine, no ISBN
 Weinstein, Norman (1976): The King's Indian Attack, Dallas: Chess Digest Magazine, no ISBN
 Schiller, Eric (1989): How To Play The Kings Indian Attack, Moon Township: Chess Enterprises, 
 Norwood, David (1991): King's Indian Attack, London: Trends Publications, without ISBN
 Tangborn, Eric (1992): A Fischer Favorite: The King's Indian Attack – with 46 fully annotated Games, o.O.: International Chess Enterprises,   
 Dunnington, Angus (1993): How to Play - The King's Indian Attack - Openings, London: B.T. Batsford Ltd, 
 Henley, Ron and Hodges, Paul (1993): Power Play - The King's Indian Attack, Hagerstown: R&D Publishing, 
 Henley, Ron and Maddox, Don (1993): The ChessBase University BlueBook Guide To Winning With - The King's Indian Attack, Hagerstown: R&D Publishing, 
 Hall, John and Cartier, Jan R. (1996): Modern King's Indian Attack – A Complete System for White, Dallas Texas: Hays Publishing, 
 New In Chess Yearbook (1998): King's Indian Attack: Black castles kingside, Alkmaar: Interchess BV, Vol. 49, p. 186-190
 New In Chess Yearbook (1999): King's Indian Attack, Alkmaar: Interchess BV, Vol. 50, p. 182-186
 Maddox, Don (2002): Königsindischer Angriff - Schach Training, Hamburg: ChessBase GmbH, 
 New In Chess Yearbook (2005): King's Indian Attack, Alkmaar: Interchess BV, Vol. 76, p. 228-232
 Dzindzichashvili, Roman (2005): Easy Way to Learn The King's Indian Attack, Internet: ChessDVDs.com, Roman's Lab, Volume 28, Nr. 7-37885-35839-1
 Davies, Nigel (2008): King's Indian Attack, Hamburg: ChessBase GmbH, fritztrainer opening,

External links

Chess database
Introduction to the King's Indian Attack

Chess openings